Lowell is an unincorporated community in LaSalle County, Illinois, United States. The town was laid out around 1830 by William Seeley. It once thrived due its location on the Peoria-Chicago Stagecoach Route, the waterpower of the Vermilion River and the coal outcroppings along the river bluffs. It developed several stores and taverns, a mill and a brick factory and a railroad spur that connected to the Burlington Railroad. Its most famous resident was Benjamin Lundy, a fiery Quaker abolitionist who came to Illinois to be the successor of Elijah Lovejoy, recently murdered for his anti-slavery beliefs. Lundy published the paper, Genius of Universal Emancipation from Lowell. The town declined and today offers river rafting.

References

Unincorporated communities in Illinois
Unincorporated communities in LaSalle County, Illinois
Ottawa, IL Micropolitan Statistical Area